Messier is a relatively young lunar impact crater located on the Mare Fecunditatis. The crater has a discernible oblong shape that is not caused by foreshortening. The longer dimension is oriented in an east–west direction.

Just to the west lies Messier A, a similar-sized crater with an oblong, doublet form. The longer dimension of this crater is oriented north–south, at right angles to Messier. This crater also has a curved bulge extending to the west. Messier and Messier A were photographed at high resolution by NASA's Lunar Orbiter 5 spacecraft In August 1967. The Lunar Orbiter V_041 image is archived at the Lunar and Planetary Institute website. The Lunar Orbiter V partial image shown here is derived from the Lunar Orbiter Image Recovery Project effort to reprocess these images from the original tapes.

The interiors of Messier and Messier A have a higher albedo than the surrounding mare. There is also a dark streak in the center of each crater. Two prominent, nearly linear rays extend westwards from the rim of Messier A, continuing over 100 kilometers towards the west edge of Mare Fecunditatis. The mare surface around the craters is also lightly marked by rays from other craters.

It is theorized that Messier crater was formed by an impact at a very low angle, and that Messier A could have formed following a rebound by the impacting body. The low angle of impact may also explain the asymmetrical ray system.

To the northwest of Messier A is a long, narrow rille, called Rima Messier.

This crater is named in honor of the French astronomer Charles Messier (1730–1817).

Satellite craters
By convention these features are identified on lunar maps by placing the letter on the side of the crater midpoint that is closest to Messier.

The following crater has been renamed by the IAU.

 Messier G - See Lindbergh (crater).

Messier A has been called W. H. Pickering, but this was never officially sanctioned by the IAU. A different crater has since been named for Pickering.

Gallery

References

Lunar crater references

External links
http://messier.seds.org/xtra/m-crater.html
 Charles A. Wood. Messier on the Moon. Sky & Telescope, August 1, 2006

Impact craters on the Moon